Jonathan Aspropotamitis (born 7 June 1996), commonly known as Jonathan Aspro, is an Australian professional footballer who  plays for Macarthur FC.

Career

Western Sydney Wanderers
He made his professional debut on 11 March 2015 vs Melbourne City FC in a 3–2 victory for the Western Sydney Wanderers at Pirtek Stadium.

He made his Asian Champions League debut on 7 April 2015 vs FC Seoul in a 1–1 draw at Pirtek Stadium.

"Aspro" signed his 1st professional senior contract with the Western Sydney Wanderers on 31 May 2015.

Early in the 2015–16 season Aspro got the opportunity to fill in for the experienced Alberto Aguilar who sustained an injury in the round 4 encounter v Perth Glory. An assured display from the young centre back, coupled with the Wanderers first win of the season, lead to his selection over the following weeks.

A string of solid performances lead the Wanderers to move quickly and extend the young centre backs contract for a further 2 seasons, Wanderers CEO said of the signing  “We think he will continue to develop here and really go to the next level as a centre back. He has the maturity, the composure and the determination to become a very important player for this club and we are delighted to have him sign for an additional two years.”

Central Coast Mariners
On 14 May 2018, the Western Sydney Wanderers announced the departure of Aspro, who was then signed by the Central Coast Mariners on a one-year deal.

Western United
On 15 April 2019 Aspro signed a 2-year deal for new A-League side Western United.

Perth Glory 
In November 2020, Aspro was selected as part of the 2020 AFC Asian Champions League squad which played out the remaining games, which were originally postponed due the COVID-19 pandemic, in Qatar. He scored Perth Glory's first ever goal in continental competition in a 1–2 loss against Shanghai Shenhua.

International career
In 2017 Aspropotamitis was part of the Australia men's national under-23 soccer team squad which competed in the 2018 AFC U-23 Championship qualification tournament. He played in all three games as captain, while being voted Man of the Match in the first match and scoring a goal in the final match.

Personal life
Educated at Newington College. He is of Greek ancestry.

Honours
Western Sydney Wanderers
Y-League: 2017–18

Macarthur
Australia Cup: 2022

References

External links
 
 Jonathan Aspropotamitis | Post Match Press Conference March 11, 2015 Western Sydney Wanderers March 12, 2015
 Jonathan Aspropotamitis the silver lining to Western Sydney Wanderers' injury clouds SMH Online March 31, 2015
 Jonathan Aspropotamitis Signs 1st Professional Contract Western Sydney Wanderers May 31, 2015
 Aspro Inks Two Year Extension in Red & Black Western Sydney Wanderers December 15, 2015

Living people
1996 births
People educated at Newington College
Association football central defenders
Australian people of Greek descent
Western Sydney Wanderers FC players
Central Coast Mariners FC players
Western United FC players
Perth Glory FC players
Macarthur FC players
A-League Men players
Soccer players from Sydney
Australian soccer players